Arthur Lockett (11 March 1877 – 5 March 1959) was an English footballer who played in the Football League for Aston Villa, Preston North End and Stoke.

Club career
Lockett was born in Alsager and played for local amateur sides Alsager's Bank, Audley and Cross Heath before joining Crewe Alexandra. He joined Stoke in 1900 for a small fee and played 16 times during the 1900–01 season as Stoke fought a successful battle against relegation. The next season saw Stoke again in relegation trouble and for the second season running surviving on the final day. Lockett experience a much better 1902–03 campaign as Stoke finished 6th, their highest league position to that point. Lockett's good form was rewarded as he was called up for England duties in February 1903.
 
Before the season was finished Lockett joined Aston Villa where he spent two season before joining Preston North End.

International career
Lockett played one game for England whilst with Stoke, which came in a 4–0 win over Ireland in February 1903.

Career statistics

Club
Source:

International
Source:

References

External links
 England Profile

English footballers
England international footballers
Aston Villa F.C. players
Crewe Alexandra F.C. players
Preston North End F.C. players
Stoke City F.C. players
Watford F.C. players
English Football League players
1877 births
1959 deaths
Association football wingers
English Football League representative players
People from Alsager